Deer Mountain is a summit in Herkimer County, New York in the Adirondack Mountains. It is located north of Little Rapids in the Town of Webb. Greenfield Mountain is located northwest, Summit Mountain is located southwest and Mount Electra is located south-southeast of Deer Mountain.

References

Mountains of Herkimer County, New York
Mountains of New York (state)